The Royal Military Canal is a canal running for  between Seabrook near Folkestone and Cliff End near Hastings, following the old cliff line bordering Romney Marsh, which was constructed as a defence against the possible invasion of England during the Napoleonic Wars.

History

Origin and construction
The canal was conceived by Lieutenant-Colonel John Brown of the Royal Staff Corps of field engineers in 1804, during anti-invasion preparations, as a defensible barrier to ensure that a French force could not use the Romney Marsh as a bridgehead. It had previously been assumed that the marsh could be inundated in the event of an invasion, but Brown argued that this would take ten days to implement and would cause massive disruption in the event of a false alarm. At a meeting on 26 September 1804, the Prime Minister, William Pitt the Younger, and the Commander-in-Chief of the Forces, the Duke of York, both enthusiastically endorsed the scheme. John Rennie was appointed consultant engineer, and Pitt personally persuaded the local landowners to agree to the new canal.

Construction was started at Seabrook, near Hythe in Kent on 30 October 1804. By May 1805 only six miles of the canal had been completed; William Pitt intervened and the contractors and Rennie were dismissed. The work was resumed by the Quartermaster-General’s department with Lt-Col. Brown in command. Civilian navvies dug the canal itself, while soldiers built the ramparts; up to 1,500 men were employed in the project. It was constructed in two sections: the longer section starts at Hythe and ends at Iden Lock in East Sussex; the second, smaller section, runs from the foot of Winchelsea Hill to Cliff End. The two sections are linked by the River Rother (Eastern) and River Brede. Artillery batteries were generally located every , where the canal was staggered to create a salient, allowing the guns to enfilade the next stretch of water. A military road was built on the inland side of the canal, and crossings consisted of moveable wooden bridges. Any troops stationed or moving along the military road would have been protected by the earthen bank of the parapet, which was piled up with excavated soil. The canal was completed in April 1809 at a total cost of £234,000; it was hoped that tolls for use of the waterway and road would help to defray the cost. In addition to these works, a number of Martello towers were built to protect the vulnerable sluices that controlled the water level in the canal, being towers numbers 22 to 27 and 30, three of which are still standing.

Peacetime use
Despite the fact that the canal never saw military action, it was used to try to control smuggling from Romney Marsh. Guard houses were constructed at each bridge along its length. This met with limited success because of corrupt guards. Although a barge service was established from Hythe to Rye, the canal was abandoned in 1877 and leased to the Lords of the Level of Romney Marsh.

World War II

During the early stages of World War II, during preparations for a threatened German invasion, the canal was manned by 31st Independent Brigade Group, who fortified each salient with a concrete pillbox and barbed wire entanglements; numerous pillboxes survive today. In the German invasion plan, codenamed Operation Sea Lion, the paratroopers of the 7th Flieger-Division were tasked with a parachute landing to secure crossing points across the Royal Military Canal on the first day of the invasion.

The canal today

A public path runs alongside the entire length of the canal, forming part of the longer  Saxon Shore Way. Aside from being historically significant in its own right, the path passes by numerous WW II pillboxes and the unusual acoustic mirrors, the historic cinque port towns of Hythe, Winchelsea, and Rye, the 12th century St Rumwold's church, and Lympne and Camber castles.

The canal is an important environmental site, and passes through several Sites of Special Scientific Interest. The Environment Agency is the navigation authority and uses the waterway to manage water levels on Romney Marsh and Walland Marsh. It is important for fish and other wildlife, including kingfishers, dragonflies, and marsh frogs.

See also

Canals of the United Kingdom
History of the British canal system
British anti-invasion preparations of 1803–1805

References

Bibliography

External links
The Canal page at the Romney Marsh Countryside Project website
images & map of mile markers seen along the Royal Military canal

History of Kent
Napoleon's planned invasion of the United Kingdom
Fortification lines
Canals in Kent
Canals opened in 1809